Sounds Air is a New Zealand airline based at Picton. The airline was founded in 1986 by Cliff and Diane Marchant to provide low cost flights to the Marlborough Sounds. The airline has a maintenance facility at Omaka aerodrome with its Sounds Aero Maintenance division based there.

History
From a single Cessna Caravan operating one route across the Cook Strait, Sounds Air has grown in 30 years; the airline carried 78,000 passengers in 2015, compared to 14,000 passengers in 2003. In 2008 the airline set up its own maintenance division as the airline could not find a company suitable to maintain its fleet. In 2017, Sounds Air signalled that they were looking at buying twin engine planes for the first time: up to three 19-seater Beech 1900 aircraft to support extra demand for the Blenheim to Christchurch route.

Services
Sounds Air operates scheduled flights between Wellington and Picton, Nelson, Blenheim, Taupo and Westport. Scheduled flights are also available between Blenheim and Christchurch, and Paraparaumu. Nelson also has flights to Paraparaumu. Sounds Air formerly served Kaikoura, Napier and Whanganui from Wellington, Napier from Blenheim and Kapiti Coast from Picton. A service to Masterton was being considered from Wellington, however no such service eventuated, because the town wanted the link to Auckland reinstated instead.
In addition to scheduled flights Sounds Air offers scenic flights over the Marlborough Sounds and Abel Tasman National Park.
The airline started temporary services to Kaikoura from Christchurch and Blenheim on 21 November 2016 following the 2016 Kaikoura earthquake. The Kaikoura to Christchurch flights ceased from 27 January 2017 followed by the Blenheim flights on 29 December 2017. From this date onwards Kaikoura will become a charter route only. Sounds Air commenced Christchurch to Wānaka another former Air New Zealand route on 2 November 2020.

Destinations

Sounds Air operates scheduled services to the following destinations within New Zealand:

Fleet
As of July 2020 the Sounds air fleet consists of ten aircraft.

Future
On 28 September 2020, the airline signed a letter of intent to Swedish company Heart Aerospace to purchase their ES-19 electric aircraft once it comes available, scheduled for 2026. The airline hopes the ES-19 will be able to make them the first regional airline to offer Zero-emissions flights. In 2022 this was upgraded to the ES-30.

Accidents and incidents
On 19 March 1989 Britten Norman BN2A Islander, ZK-SFE, while attempting to land at Tiraora Lodge struck a telephone wire and descended into the sea. The pilot and five passengers were rescued but suffered varying degrees of injury.
On 29 January 1996 Cessna 208 Caravan, ZK-SFA, crashed into the eastern slopes of Mount Robertson on approach to Picton Aerodrome at Koromiko after a flight from Wellington. All five passengers were killed, but the pilot survived.

References

External links

Sounds Air official website
Sounds Air aircraft

Airlines of New Zealand
Picton, New Zealand
Airlines established in 1986
New Zealand companies established in 1986